The 28 cm SK L/45 was a German naval gun that was used in World War I and World War II. Originally a naval gun, it was adapted for land service after World War I.

Description
It used the Krupp horizontal sliding-block breech design (or “wedge”, as it is sometimes referred to) rather than the interrupted screw commonly used in heavy guns of other nations. This required that the propellant charge be loaded in a metal, usually brass, case which provides obduration i.e. seals the breech to prevent escape of the expanding propellant gas.

History

Naval guns
Mounted on s and the battlecruiser .

Coast defense guns
Three guns were mounted at Battery Goeben on Husøya island, near Trondheim, Norway and formed Naval Coast Artillery Battery (Marine Artillerie Batterie) "Goeben", later 1st Battery, Naval Artillery Battalion (1./Marine Artillerie Abteilung) 507 "Husöen".

Another three guns were mounted at Battery Tirpitz on the Romanian coast, south of Constanța, from April 1941 to August 1944, when the battery was destroyed by the retreating Germans. The battery, like all Axis forces in Romania, was nominally under Romanian control, but operated by Kriegsmarine personnel, and contributed to the defence of Constanța in 1941.

See also
 List of naval guns

Footnotes

References

Bibliography

External links

 SK L/45 at Navweaps.com

280 mm artillery
Naval guns of Germany
Coastal artillery